The Barbue River (in French: rivière Barbue) is a tributary of the Noire River which is a tributary of the Bécancour River. It flows in the municipalities of Laurierville and Notre-Dame-de-Lourdes, in the L'Érable Regional County Municipality (MRC), in the administrative region of Centre-du-Québec, in Quebec, in Canada.

Geography 
The main neighboring hydrographic slopes of the Barbue River are:
 north side: Bécancour River;
 east side: Bécancour River;
 south side: Perdrix River, Noire River, McKenzie River, Bécancour River;
 west side: Noire River, Bécancour River.

The Barbue River rises at the boundary between the municipalities of Laurierville and Lyster.

  southwest, to route 116, in the village of Sainte-Julie Station;
  towards the north, passing through the village, making a loop towards the west, to the confluence of the Roger-Gingras-Sud stream;
  westward, up to the limit between the municipalities of Notre-Dame-de-Lourdes, Plessisville (parish) and Laurierville;
  westward, up to its confluence.

Toponymy 
The toponym "rivière Barbue" was made official on December 5, 1968, at the Commission de toponymie du Québec.

See also 

 List of rivers of Quebec

Notes and references 

Rivers of Centre-du-Québec
L'Érable Regional County Municipality